Pasquale Pugliese (born 6 November 1952) is an Italian racing cyclist. He rode in the 1979 Tour de France.

References

External links
 

1952 births
Living people
Italian male cyclists
Place of birth missing (living people)
People from Prato
Sportspeople from the Province of Prato
Cyclists from Tuscany